Minnesota State Highway 247 (MN 247) is a  highway in southeast Minnesota, which runs from its intersection with U.S. Highway 63 in Farmington Township, north of Rochester; and continues east to its eastern terminus at its intersection with State Highway 42 in the city of Plainview.

Route description

Highway 247 serves as an east–west route between Farmington Township, the unincorporated community of Potsdam, and the city of Plainview.

In the city of Plainview, Highway 247 follows West Broadway, which is also the main street of Plainview.

The route is legally defined as Route 247 in the Minnesota Statutes.

History
Highway 247 was authorized on July 1, 1949.

At the time it was marked, the highway was only paved in Potsdam and Plainview. The remainder of the route was paved in the mid-1950s.

Major intersections

References

External links

 
Highway 247 at the Unofficial Minnesota Highways Page

247
Transportation in Olmsted County, Minnesota
Transportation in Wabasha County, Minnesota